Charles Tribble (April 24, 1942 – October 17, 2009) was an American wrestler. He competed in the men's freestyle welterweight at the 1964 Summer Olympics.

References

1942 births
2009 deaths
American male sport wrestlers
Olympic wrestlers of the United States
Wrestlers at the 1964 Summer Olympics
People from Indio, California